Winsick is a hamlet in Derbyshire, England. It is located on the B6039 Mansfield Road, 2 miles south of Chesterfield. It is part of the civil parish of Grassmoor, Hasland and Winsick.

Hamlets in Derbyshire
North East Derbyshire District